Different from Whom? is a 2009 Italian comedy film directed by Umberto Carteni.

Plot
Piero is a young openly gay left-wing politician who lives in Trieste with his boyfriend Remo. During his mayoral election campaign the party decides to also to run Adele, a Catholic and strict conservative politician, as deputy mayor. Piero and Adele will discover to be attracted to each other, causing a stir among the voters and the political opponents, and suddenly turning Piero's boyfriend Remo into the odd man out.

Cast 
Luca Argentero as Piero
Claudia Gerini as  Adele
Filippo Nigro as  Remo
Francesco Pannofino as  Galeazzo
Giuseppe Cederna as  Serafini
Antonio Catania as  Corazza
  Rinaldo Rocco as  Samuele
Paolo Graziosi

Reception
The film has been cited as an example of sexual fluidity in recent queer European cinema.

Different from Whom? was criticized by a panelist at the Melbourne Queer Film Festival as a film that was "made for straight audiences" and claimed that the film panders to heterosexuals who are uncomfortable with homosexuality.

Awards
2009 - Globi d'oro
Best First Feature to Umberto Carteni
Nomination Best Comedy to Umberto Carteni

See also   
 List of Italian films of 2009

References

External links 

2009 comedy films
2009 LGBT-related films
2009 films
2009 directorial debut films
Films directed by Umberto Carteni
Films set in Trieste
Gay-related films
2000s political comedy films
Italian LGBT-related films
LGBT-related comedy films
Male bisexuality in film
Italian political comedy films